RFB or RfB may refer to:

 Radio Free Brooklyn, a community freeform Internet radio station in Brooklyn, NY
 Redox Flow battery, a kind of battery that uses a liquid electrolyte that flows through tanks, unlike Dry Cells with solid electrolytes, such as typical Alkaline batteries or Lithium-ion batteries. 
 Reichenbachfall Funicular, in the Swiss canton of Berne 
 Regional fishery body 
 RFB protocol, a simple "remote framebuffer" protocol for remote access to graphical user interfaces
 Rhein-Flugzeugbau, a German aircraft company
 "Room, Food, and Beverage", see Comps (casino)
 Roter Frontkämpferbund ("Red Front Fighters' League"), a paramilitary organization of the Communist Party of Germany during the Weimar Republic
 Kel-Tec RFB, a gas-operated semi-automatic rifle
 República Federativa do Brasil
 Request For Bid, a business process to request pricing on a specific product from vendors. See Call For Bids